Sir Anthony Shirley (or Sherley) (1565–1635) was an English traveller, whose imprisonment in 1603 by King James I caused the English House of Commons to assert one of its privileges—freedom of its members from arrest—in a document known as The Form of Apology and Satisfaction.

Family
Anthony Shirley was the second son of Sir Thomas Shirley of Wiston, Sussex, and Anne Kempe, the daughter of Sir Thomas Kempe (d. 7 March 1591) of Olantigh in Wye, Kent. He had an elder brother, Sir Thomas Shirley, and a younger brother, Sir Robert Shirley, and six sisters who survived infancy.

Career
Educated at the University of Oxford, Shirley gained military experience with the English troops in the Netherlands and during an expedition to Northern France in 1591 where he distinguished himself at the Battle of Château-Laudran. Later in the year he fought under The 2nd Earl of Essex, who was related to his wife, Frances Vernon; about this time he was knighted by Henry of Navarre (Henry IV of France), and fought alongside English and Swiss troops in support of Henry, who at the time was Protestant (fighting the Catholic League) at the Siege of Rouen.  As a result of his fighting prowess, Shirley and fellow knight combatant Sir Nicolas Clifford (also related to the Earl of Essex), were awarded French honorifics, an event which brought upon both men the displeasure of their own sovereign, and as a result, a short imprisonment.

In 1596, Shirley conducted a predatory expedition along the western coast of Africa and then across to Central America, including a raid on Spanish Jamaica a year later. According to Anthony Standen he had sailed from Plymouth on 21 May 1596 with five ships, with the financial support of the Earl of Essex but had hoped to command a larger fleet. Owing to a mutiny he returned to London with a single ship in 1597.

In 1598, he led a few English volunteers to Italy to take part in a dispute over the possession of Ferrara; this, however, had been accommodated when he reached Venice, and he decided to journey to Persia with the twofold object of promoting trade between England and Persia and of stirring up the Persians against the Turks. He obtained money at Constantinople and at Aleppo, and was very well received by the Shah, Abbas the Great, who made him a Mirza, or prince, and granted certain trading and other rights to all Christian merchants.

Then, as the Shah's representative, he returned to Europe and visited Moscow, Prague, Rome, and other cities, but the English government would not allow him to return to his own country. Two members of his expedition returned to London, where they published the anonymous pamphlet The True Report of Sir Anthony Shirley's Journey, which, additionally spurred by the actor Will Kempe's meeting with Sir Anthony in Rome, evoked two references to "the Sophy"— the Shah— in Shakespeare's Twelfth Night (1601–02).

For some time he was in prison in Venice, and in 1605, he went to Prague and was sent by Rudolph II, Holy Roman Emperor on a mission to Morocco; afterwards he went to Lisbon and to Madrid, where he was welcomed very warmly. The King of Spain appointed him the admiral of a fleet which was to serve in the Levant, but the only result of his extensive preparations was an unsuccessful expedition against the island of Mitylene. After this he was deprived of his command. Shirley, who was a count of the Holy Roman Empire, died at Madrid some time after 1635.

Shirley wrote an account of his adventures, Sir Anthony Sherley: his Relation of his Travels into Persia (1613), the original manuscript of which is in the Bodleian Library at Oxford. There are in existence five or more accounts of Shirley's adventures in Persia, and the account of his expedition in 1596 is published in Richard Hakluyt's Voyages and Discoveries (1809-1812). See also The Three Brothers; Travels and Adventures of Sir Anthony, Sir Robert and Sir Thomas Sherley in Persia, Russia, Turkey and Spain (London, 1825); EP Shirley, The Sherley Brothers (1848), and the same writer's Stemmata Shirleiana (1841, again 1873).

See also
 García de Silva Figueroa

Notes

References
 
 
 
 
 
Attribution

External links
 

1565 births
1635 deaths
English explorers
English soldiers
French knights
Spanish admirals
English travel writers
Counts of the Holy Roman Empire
16th-century English writers
16th-century male writers
17th-century English writers
17th-century English male writers
Explorers of Iran
Safavid diplomats
People from Wiston, West Sussex